Knut Johan Ångström (12 January 18574 March 1910) was a Swedish physicist. He was the son of physicist Anders Jonas Ångström and studied in Uppsala from 1877 to 1884, when he received his licentiat-degree, before going for a short time to the University of Strassburg (Strasbourg) to study with August Kundt. Coming back to Uppsala, he completed his doctoral degree and was appointed lecturer in physics at the new university college in Stockholm (now Stockholm University) in 1885. After a few years working there, he returned to Uppsala in 1891 and received the professorship of Physics in 1896.

He focused his research work on investigating the radiation of heat from the sun, terrestrial nocturnal emission and its absorption by the Earth's atmosphere, and to that end devised various delicate methods and instruments, including his electric compensation pyrheliometer, invented in 1893, apparatus for obtaining a photographic representation of the infra-red spectrum (1895) and pyrgeometer (abt. 1905).

In 1900, Herr J. Koch, laboratory assistant to Knut  Ångström, did not observe any appreciable change in the absorption of infrared radiation by decreasing the concentration of  up to a third of the initial amount. This  result, in addition to the observation made a couple of years before that the superposition of the water vapour absorption bands, more abundant in the atmosphere, over those of CO2, convinced some geologists for a time that calculations by Svante Arrhenius for  warming were wrong; though subsequent work in following decades eventually vindicated Arrhenius.

The experiment, however, was careless seen from the current perspective with erroneous result but of a historical significance in the development of the theory of the greenhouse effect amplified by CO2.

He was elected a member of the Royal Swedish Academy of Sciences in 1893.

References

 Ångström K, 1900, "Ueber die Bedeutung des Wasserdampfes und der Kohlensäure bei der Absorption der Erdatmosphäre", Annalen der Physik Bd 3. 1900, p720-732. http://www.realclimate.org/images/Angstrom.pdf

External links
Olof Beckman, Anders Jonas and Knut Ångström (in Swedish)

1857 births
1910 deaths
19th-century Swedish physicists
Uppsala University alumni
19th-century Swedish inventors
Members of the Royal Swedish Academy of Sciences
Burials at Uppsala old cemetery
20th-century Swedish physicists